Dubai World Central is a city that was under construction in Dubai, United Arab Emirates in 2006, planned to be an economic zone to support a number of activities including logistics, aviation, commercial, exhibition, humanitarian, residential and other related businesses around Al Maktoum International Airport with the planned annual capacity of 12 million tonnes of cargo and 160 million passengers. The construction area is two times the size of Hong Kong Island.

The development was planned to comprise the following sub-development projects: 

Dubai World Central Residential City
Dubai World Central Logistics City
Dubai World Central Enterprise Park
Dubai World Central Commercial City
Dubai World Central Aviation City
Dubai World Central - Al Maktoum International Airport
Dubai World Central Staff Village
Dubai World Central Golf City

References

External links
 Dubai World Central website 

Special economic zones
Companies based in Dubai